SwingThought, formerly the NGA Pro Golf Tour, is the oldest developmental golf tour based in the United States. The tour was acquired by Golf Interact in 2014 and rebranded as SwingThought. The tour consists of around 25 professional golf tournaments, making it the third largest series in the United States after the elite PGA Tour and its developmental series, the Korn Ferry Tour. 

The tour was founded by T. C. "Rick" Jordan in 1988 and later sold to Hooters restaurant chain owner Robert H. Brooks in 1994. Hooters was the title sponsor from 1988 through 2011, with the tour branded as the NGA Hooters tour. The tour was sold to Robin Waters of Loris, South Carolina in 2011. In 2015, Golf Interact purchased eGolf Professional Tour and integrated it into the Swing Thought Tour. As of August 2016, no previous ownership or management of the previous tours remain involved in SwingThought.

Combined money leaders

References

External links
Official site

Professional golf tours
Golf in the United States